Giuseppe Lolaico (born 3 March 1982) is an Italian footballer.

Primarily a full-back, he could play on both flank and occasionally plays as a winger.

Biography
Born in Tricarico, Basilicata, Lolaico started his career in the region capital, Potenza, at non-professional level. He then played for Pro Vercelli, Pizzighettone before returned to Potenza, now at Serie C2. That season he won the promotion play-offs to 2007–08 Serie C1.

In July 2008 he was signed by Serie B club Rimini but in August returned to Potenza along with Raffaele Nolè. In August 2009, Potenza bought him outright and signed a reported 2-year contract. On 1 February 2010, the last day of winter transfer window, the Potenza captain joined fellow Prima Divisione team Pergocrema. (but from Group A, Potenza was in B) In June Pergocrema won the relegation "play-out" (which he was the starting right-back in the second leg) but Potenza bankrupted.

In 2010–11 Lega Pro Prima Divisione he only made 18 starts but played in both legs of the relegation "play-out" as a left wing-back in 3–5–2/5–3–2 formation. The right wing-back position was occupied by Daniele Ghidotti.

International career
Lolaico represented Italy Universiade team and finished as the runner-up at 2009 Summer Universiade in July.

References

External links
 Football.it Profile 
 
 

Italian footballers
Potenza S.C. players
Potenza Calcio players
F.C. Pro Vercelli 1892 players
A.S. Pizzighettone players
Rimini F.C. 1912 players
U.S. Pergolettese 1932 players
Association football fullbacks
Sportspeople from the Province of Matera
1982 births
Living people
Footballers from Basilicata
Universiade silver medalists for Italy
Universiade medalists in football
Medalists at the 2009 Summer Universiade